Phantoms of Happiness (German: Phantome des Glücks) is a 1930 German drama film directed by Reinhold Schünzel and starring Michael Chekhov, Karina Bell and Gaston Modot. It was originally made as a silent, then re-released in 1930 with an added soundtrack. The film's art direction was by Heinz Fenchel and Jacek Rotmil. It was shot at the Marienfelde Studios in Berlin and premiered at the city's Marmorhaus.

Cast
 Michael Chekhov as Jacques Bramard
 Karina Bell as Marisa, a dancer
 Gaston Modot as Dupont
 Oskar Sima as J. Berré
 Ekkehard Arendt as René:, Vallon, Komponist
 Yvette Darnys as Frau Dupont
 Inge Landgut as Madeleine
 Leonard Steckel as Gefängnisarzt

References

Bibliography
 Prawer, S.S. Between Two Worlds: The Jewish Presence in German and Austrian Film, 1910-1933. Berghahn Books, 2005.

External links

1930 films
Films of the Weimar Republic
German silent feature films
German drama films
1930s German-language films
Films directed by Reinhold Schünzel
Transitional sound drama films
German black-and-white films
Terra Film films
Silent drama films
1930s German films
Films shot at Terra Studios